D-aspartate oxidase is an enzyme that is encoded by the DDO gene.

The protein encoded by this gene is a peroxisomal flavoprotein that catalyzes the oxidative deamination of D-aspartate and N-methyl D-aspartate. Flavin adenine dinucleotide or 6-hydroxyflavin adenine dinucleotide can serve as the cofactor in this reaction. Two (or four, according to ) transcript variants encoding different isoforms have been found for this gene.

References

Further reading